Carex preissii is a flowering plant in the sedge family, Cyperaceae, that is native to Western Australia.

The species was described by the botanist Christian Gottfried Daniel Nees von Esenbeck in 1846 as a part of the work Plantae Preissianae. The type specimen was collected by Ludwig Preiss. 

The sedge is found along the coast in the Peel, South West, Great Southern and Goldfields-Esperance regions.

References

preissii
Plants described in 1846
Flora of Western Australia
Taxa named by Christian Gottfried Daniel Nees von Esenbeck